Municipality of Adamstown was a Local Government Area of New South Wales from 1886 until 1938 when it became part of the City of Greater Newcastle. It was named after and comprised the township of  near Newcastle.

The township had been established in 1869. The Municipalities Act of 1857 provided that an area could become a municipality if there was a petition of at least 50 people who would be ratepayers in the district. Most of the nearby towns had become municipalities in the 1870s and 209 people signed a petition for Adamstown that was published in March 1885. The main reason for becoming a municipality was for roads, drains and nightsoil collection. The major employer in town was coal mining. The municipality was proclaimed on 31 December 1885 and its main boundaries were Hamilton and Merewether to the east, while the railway formed the north western boundary separating it from New Lambton.

The first council election was held on Saturday 6 March 1886, electing 9 aldermen to serve a 3 year term, including Alfred Edden, who was President of the Waratah colliery lodge. The aldermen unanimously elected Thomas Weir as the inaugural mayor of Adamstown.

Women were not eligible to serve on the council until 1919, however no women were subsequently elected.

There had been proposals to merge the "pocket-handkerchief municipalities" surrounding Newcastle since 1891, including the Greater Newcastle Royal Commission in 1919, however this did not eventuate until 1937 when the Greater Newcastle Act 1937 merged Adamstown and 9 other municipalities with City of Newcastle to create the City of Greater Newcastle. The date of the amalgamation was 2 April 1938.

Mayors

References

Former local government areas of New South Wales
1885 establishments in Australia
1938 disestablishments in Australia